Andrew Tyler (8 September 1946 – 28 April 2017) was an English animal rights activist and journalist. He was the director of the animal rights organisation Animal Aid, until 2016. As a journalist, he wrote for Drapers & Fashion Weekly, NME, Time Out, The Guardian and The Independent.

Biography 
Tyler was born on 8 September 1946, in Hackney, London. He grew up in a Jewish children's home from the ages of six to fourteen, when he left school and worked his way up to being a junior reporter at Drapers & Fashion Weekly. Tyler wrote for NME from 1973 to 1980, interviewing several famous musicians including, Bruce Springsteen, Stevie Wonder, Ray Davies, Leonard Cohen and John Lennon. In the early 1980s, he was news feature editor for Time Out. He joined Animal Aid in 1995, later becoming director.

Tyler married Sara Starkey in 1978, who had a son from a previous marriage.

Near the end of his life, Tyler suffered from a degenerative back condition and Parkinson’s disease. He retired in 2016 and finished his memoir My Life As an Animal (2017). For the final six weeks of his life, he recorded a video diary, in which he advocated for allowing people to die with dignity. Tyler ended his life at the Dignitas clinic in Switzerland, on 28 April 2017.

Selected publications

Articles 
 "Porton Down", Vegan Views, Autumn 2001.
 A National disgrace?, The Guardian, 3 April 2004.
 with Peter Webbon. "Should the Grand National be axed for being too cruel?", The Guardian, 4 May 2006.
 Don't be blinkered to the cruelty of racing, The Guardian, 18 November 2005.
 "An Act that has failed to protect animals", The Independent, 17 April 2006.
 "Xenotransplantation", Genetic Futures News, undated, retrieved 18 September 2006.

Books 
 Big Pig (Animal Aid, 2005)
My Life As an Animal (2017)

See also 
 List of animal rights advocates

References

Further reading
Animal Aid
CV for Andrew Tyler, McSpotlight.org; includes Tyler's witness statement to the McLibel case.
Andrew Taylor at Rock's Backpages

1946 births
2017 deaths
20th-century British journalists
21st-century British journalists
Barbiturates-related deaths
English animal rights activists
English male journalists
English music journalists
Deaths by euthanasia
Drug-related suicides in Switzerland
Euthanasia activists
Jewish English activists
Jewish journalists
NME writers
People from Hackney, London
The Independent people
The Guardian people